Mario Santoro – Woith (born 1968 in Cuba) is an Italian photographer working in the field of experimental photography, xerography, printmaking and self-publishing artist's books. He is based in Todi (Umbria).

His work has been exhibited internationally and is held in numerous private and public Artist's book collections including the Museum of Modern Art in New York City.

Education 
Mario Santoro-Woith studied Visual Anthropology at the University of Rome "La Sapienza" from 1988 to 1993. 
In 1996, during a Visual sociology Seminar held in Viterbo, he met Professor John Grady, who invited him to exhibit his photographs at Wheaton College (Boston). The subsequent exhibition took place shortly after at the Wallace library.

Works and Technique 

Mario's mastery of the conceptual, technical and mechanical aspects of experimental photography culminate in his extensive use of photocopying machines and industrial machines overlaid with photography. With these machines and techniques, he created large-scale works and installations. Such prints span many meters and have been exhibited in installations as well as set designs for theater performances. 
One of Mario's primary photography philosophies is to reject the notion that xerography is less sophisticated or complex than other artistic printing processes and mediums. Alongside other artists working with similar mediums, Mario consistently encourages the production and documentation of artworks made with these mechanical techniques. In 2015, he joined Makroscope Artist's group and exhibited his works at the Klaus Urbons Copymuseum in Mülheim an der Ruhr (Germany), where this group is based.

Mario's recent artworks are printed with an Electrophotography (LED head) technique, Organic Photoconductor Drums and closed toner system. Mario also researches on paper making and attentively chooses his printing papers: black recycled paper, rice paper and other handmade japanese papers.

Artist's books 
Mario Santoro-Woith has self-published several limited edition artist's books. These books largely investigate controversial topics, in the hopes of provoking questions and eliciting impassioned responses. The visual research displayed in these books explores the darker part of humanity and draws our attention to evil in all its guises – racism, pornography, terrorism etc. He seeks to push social and political boundaries.

In 2011, his book trilogy, "EUR", "Decadence, Darkness, Empire" and "More War, Less Art" was acquired by the Library Council Collection of artist's books at the Museum of Modern Art (New York). In book one, he looks at propaganda and the form it takes in architecture (the "EUR" book), in book two, he visually explores imperialism ("Decadence, Darkness, Empire"), and in book three, he focuses on symbolism ("More War, Less Art").

The books present various photographic techniques, drawing, screen printing and other media. He designs and prints them individually in his studio. The final print consists of four colors, printed one at a time (black, white, red and blue) that results in a tridimensional multi-layer print. These books are hand bound in Perugia, Italy. Each copy is numbered and signed. From 2010 to 2012 he was one of the artists of the ABC Artists' Books Cooperative.

Selected Shows

 2015 – Klaus Urbons Copymuseum \ Makroscope \ Medienhaus (Mulheim an der Ruhr);
 2015 – Nun Relais e Museum (Assisi;)
 2014 – Acta International Gallery (Rome);
 2014 – Castello di Sismano (Todi);
 2014 – Antonello Colonna Resort (Labico);
 2012 New York – "Archi-Texture" – (Jadite Gallery);
 2011 Venice Biennale – Umbrian Pavilion – Palazzo Collicola – Spoleto;
 2006 New York – "Empire, Decadence, Darkness" – Italian Academy at Columbia University;
 2005 Tokyo – "Heisenberg's Snapshots II" (Dazzle Gallery);
 2003 New York – "The Wizard's House" (M.Y. Art Prospects Gallery);
 2002 New York – "Heisenberg's Snapshots" (M.Y. Art Prospects Gallery);
 2001 USA – "Art Miami";
 2000 Germania – "Kunst Colonia";
 1999 Milan – Galleria "Il Diaframma" (Curator );
 1998 Losanne – Musée de l'Élysée (Curator );
 1997 Milan – Giovenzana "Images on the road" (Curator Lanfranco Colombo);
 1996 Boston (MA) The Wallace Library, Wheaton College (Curator John Grady);
 1995 Rome – Studio "S" Arte Contemporanea (Curator Carmine Siniscalco).

References

Further reading
 Copy Art Bibliography compiled by Reed Altemus for Leonardo/ISAST

External links

Official Website
True Umbria website

1968 births
Living people
Italian photographers
Italian conceptual artists
Italian printmakers
Xerox artists